Stracena is a genus of moths in the subfamily Lymantriinae. The genus was erected by Charles Swinhoe in 1903.

Species
Stracena aegrota Le Cerf, 1922
Stracena bananae (Butler, [1897]) Malawi
Stracena bananoides (Hering, 1927) Gabon
Stracena barnsi (Collenette, 1930) Angola
Stracena eximia (Holland, 1893) north-western Congo, western Africa
Stracena flavescens (Aurivillius, 1925) western Africa
Stracena flavipectus (C. Swinhoe, 1904) Nigeria
Stracena fuscivena C. Swinhoe, 1903 Nigeria
Stracena oloris (Hering, 1926)
Stracena pellucida Grünberg, 1907
Stracena promelaena (Holland, 1893) Gabon
Stracena sulphureivena (Aurivillius, 1904) western Africa
Stracena summisa (Hering, 1927) Kenya

References

Lymantriinae